Crambella is a genus of flowering plants belonging to the family Brassicaceae.

Its native range is Morocco.

Species:
 Crambella teretifolia (Batt. & Trab.) Maire

References

Brassicaceae
Taxa named by René Maire
Brassicaceae genera